Meloe proscarabaeus is a European oil beetle. It lives in meadows, field margins and other warm sites in all but the far north of the continent. It lacks hind wings and the elytra are correspondingly reduced in size.

Life cycle
Eggs are laid in the soil by females. When the larvae hatch, they climb into a flower, and await visiting solitary bees. With their well-developed claws, the larvae attach themselves to the bee and return with it to its nest. Here, they feed on the bee's eggs and the pollen and nectar it had collected. The larva pupates in the bee's nest, and leaves the nest to seek a mate directly afterwards.
The beetle and its life cycle are described in detail by Gerald Durrell in his autobiographical book My Family and Other Animals.

Sources

Gallery

External links
ARKive Images, video, text.
ZINRus Images
Images, information, identification guide, submit records to UK oil beetle survey.

 
 

Meloidae
Beetles of Europe
Beetles described in 1758
Taxa named by Carl Linnaeus